The Sabahan languages are a group of Austronesian languages centered on the Bornean province of Sabah.

Languages

Blust (2010) 
The constituents are separated into two families in Blust (2010):

Northeast Sabahan
Bonggi
Ida’an
Southwest Sabahan
Dusunic (15)
Paitanic (4)
Murutic (7)
Tidong (5)

Lobel (2013) 
Lobel (2013b, p. 47, 361) proposes the following internal classification of Southwest Sabahan, based on phonological and morphological evidence.
Greater Dusunic
Dusunic
Bisaya-Lotud
Paitanic
Greater Murutic
Murutic
Tatana
Papar

Lobel (2013:367–368) lists the following Proto-Southwest Sabahan phonological innovations that were developed from Proto-Malayo-Polynesian. (Note: PSWSAB stands for Proto-Southwest Sabahan, while PMP stands for Proto-Malayo-Polynesian.)
PMP *h > PSWSAB Ø
PMP *a > PSWSAB *ə / _# (possibly be an areal feature in Sabah or northern Borneo, since this is also found in Idaanic)
PMP *R > PSWSAB *h / (a,i,u)_(a,ə,u)
PMP *R > PSWSAB *g / ə_
PMP *-m- > ø in PSWSAB reflexes of the PMP pronoun forms *kami ‘1EXCL.NOM’, *mami ‘1EXCL.GEN’, and *kamu ‘2PL.NOM’
Reduction of most PMP consonant clusters to either singletons or prenasalized clusters

Smith (2017)
Smith (2017) proposes a North Borneo group comprising the North Sarawak, Northeast Sabah, and Southwest Sabah branches.

North Sarawak 
Bintulu
Berawan–Lower Baram
Dayic
Kenyah
Northeast Sabah (Bonggi, Idaanic)
Southwest Sabah
Greater Dusunic
Bisaya-Lotud-Dusunic
Bisaya-Lotud (Sabah and Limbang Bisaya, Brunei Dusun, Lotud)
Dusunic (Bundu, Liwan, Tindal, Tobilung, Rungus, Kadazan, Kujau, Minokok, Dumpas, etc)
Paitanic (Beluran, Lingkabau, Lobu, Kuamut, Murut Serudong)
Greater Murutic
Tatana
Papar
Murutic (Murut (Nabaay, Timugon, Paluan, Tagol, Kalabakan), Gana, Tingalan, Kolod, Abai, Bulusu, Tidung (Bengawong, Sumbol, Kalabakan, Mensalong, Malinau))

Footnotes

References